Miecław's State was state located in Masovia with capital in Płock. It was formed around 1037 by Miecław by breaking away from Duchy of Poland during the crisis inside the country.<ref>Gallus Anonymus. Kronika polska, book 1. Wrocław. Biblioteka Źródeł Historii Polski. 1982. ISBN 978-3-939991-46-5.</ref> It existed until 1047, when Casimir I the Restorer, duke of Poland, reconquered the state into Duchy of Poland.

 History 
Following the death of Mieszko II Lambert, king of Poland, in 1034, and the exile of his son, Casimir I the Restorer, to Kingdom of Hungary, the state had fallen into a period of destabilization within the Duchy of Poland, that led to the start of the 1038 Peasant Uprising. Seizing the opportunity, around 1038, the cup-bearer Miecław had formed the state in Masovia, declaring its independence from Poland, and started his own royal dynasty.

Casimir I the Restorer, duke of Poland, had returned to the country from his exile in 1039. He had formed an alliance with Yaroslav the Wise, Grand Prince of Kiev, the leader of Kievan Rus', via the marriage of Maria Dobroniega with Casimir. Expecting the attack from Rus', Miecław had formed an alliance with Pomeranian and Yotvingian tribes. In the spring of 1041, he had begun the campaign against Polish forces. Miecław's forces had fought with the army lead by Casimir and Yaroslav, in the battle of Pobiedziska. The battle ended with a decisive Polish victory and destruction of Miecław's army and led to the signing of the truce between both sides.A. Bielowski, Kronika śląsko-polska, in Monumenta Poloniae Historica, vol. 3. p. 622.

The fighting had begun again in 1047, as Casimir I, together with Yaroslav, had organized the attack on Masovia, which lead to the battle of their forces against the forces of Miecław and Pomerelia.Nestor the Chronicler, Primary Chronicle The location of the battle remains unknown in modern times, though it was known to the 11th-century historian, Gallus Anonymus, according to whom, it took place near the river, with the bluff edge. According to him, Miecław forces had 30 divisions of cavalry, while Casimir, 3 divisions. It is probable that he did not account for the forces of Yaroslav the Wise, and that both sides, in fact, had a similar number of forces. The battle was probably initiated by Casimir I, who hoped to win before the arrival of the Pomerelian army. The battle itself was fierce, with numerous casualties on Miecław's side. The battle ended with Polish victory, following which, Miecław's state was reincorporated into Poland. According to Gallus Anonymus, Miecław had died in the battle. However, according to Wincenty Kadłubek in his Chronica seu originale regum et principum Poloniae, he had escaped to Prussia, where he was murdered.

See also
 Pagan reaction in Poland

 Citations 
 Notes 

 References 

 Bibliography 
 Wielkopolska Chronicle Ł. Piernikarczyk, Masław i jego państwo (1037–1047).
 Tadeusz Łepkowski, Słownik historii Polski. Warsaw. 1973, p. 363.
 Kazimierz Odnowiciel, Śląsk, 1979.
 A. Bielowski, Kronika śląsko-polska, in Monumenta Poloniae Historica'', vol. 3, Warsaw, 1961.

History of Poland during the Piast dynasty
History of Masovia
11th century in Poland
Former countries in Europe
Former unrecognized countries
States and territories established in the 1030s
States and territories disestablished in 1047
1030s establishments in Europe
Miecław's Rebellion